Morus celtidifolia, the Texas mulberry, is a plant species native to South America, Central America, Mexico, and the southwestern United States, ranging from Argentina north as far as Arizona and Oklahoma. It is very often referred to as "Morus microphylla," including in Flora of North America, but recent studies suggest that these names are synonymous with M. celtidifolia holding priority.

Morus celtidifolia is a shrub or tree, sometimes reaching  in height. The edible fruits are red, purple, or nearly black, and are consumed by wildlife, and, historically, by Native Americans. In ancient (probably prehistoric) times, the Havasupai people introduced the species to the Grand Canyon.

References

celtidifolia
Flora of the Southwestern United States
Flora of Central America
Flora of Mexico
Flora of South America
Plants described in 1817